The Mansion of Aching Hearts is a 1925 American silent drama film directed by James P. Hogan and starring Ethel Clayton, Barbara Bedford, and Priscilla Bonner.

Plot
As described in a film magazine review, believing his wife is unfaithful, Martin Craig sends his with Pauline and their child away. The mother looses the child while on a boat, after which the father locates it and rears it as a stranger without a last name, to be called Bill Smith. The mother, believing the child has drowned, goes to a home for friendless pregnant young women and becomes its matron. Later, she returns to the home of her son only to find that he has been taught to promise vengeance upon her for bringing him into the world nameless. A mob forms intending to chase her from the town. However, she meets Martin and forces him to publicly admit the truth that she is innocent, whereupon she and the son are admitted to respectability. A reunion between the three follows.

Cast

References

Bibliography
 Goble, Alan. The Complete Index to Literary Sources in Film. Walter de Gruyter, 1999.

External links

1925 films
1925 drama films
1920s English-language films
American silent feature films
Silent American drama films
Films directed by James Patrick Hogan
American black-and-white films
Preferred Pictures films
1920s American films